Rohatyn is a surname. Notable people with the surname include: 

Felix Rohatyn (1928–2019), American investment banker and diplomat
Jeanne Greenberg Rohatyn (born  1967), American gallerist